Owen Andrew Caissie (born July 8, 2002) is a Canadian professional baseball outfielder in the Chicago Cubs organization.

Caissie grew up in Burlington, Ontario, and attended Notre Dame Catholic Secondary School. Caissie played for Canada's Junior National team.

The San Diego Padres selected Caissie in the second round, with the 45th overall pick, of the 2020 Major League Baseball draft. He was the first player from Canada selected. He signed with the team on June 24, 2020, and received a $1,200,004 signing bonus. Caissie spent the remainder of the summer training in Ontario due to the 2020 minor league season being cancelled because of the COVID-19 pandemic.

On December 29, 2020, the Padres traded Caissie, pitcher Zach Davies, Reginald Preciado, Yeison Santana, and Ismael Mena to the Chicago Cubs in exchange for pitcher Yu Darvish and catcher Víctor Caratini. He began the 2021 minor league season with the Rookie-level Arizona Complex League Cubs, where he batted .349 with six home runs before being promoted to the Low-A Myrtle Beach Pelicans.

Caissie played for the Canadian national baseball team at the 2023 World Baseball Classic.

References

External links

2002 births
Living people
Canadian baseball players
Arizona Complex League Cubs players
Myrtle Beach Pelicans players
South Bend Cubs players
Mesa Solar Sox players
Minor league baseball players
2023 World Baseball Classic players